Dilemma of Two Angels (French: Impasse des Deux Anges) is a 1948 French crime film directed by Maurice Tourneur and starring Paul Meurisse, Simone Signoret and Marcel Herrand. It was the final film directed by Tourneur in a career that stretched back to the silent era and included nearly a hundred films.

The film's sets were designed by the art director Jean d'Eaubonne.

Cast
 Paul Meurisse as Jean
 Simone Signoret as Anne-Marie / Marianne
 Marcel Herrand as Marquis Antoine de Fontaines
 Paul Demange as Minus
 Jacques Castelot as Le Vicomte
 Marcelle Praince as La Suchesse
 Danièle Delorme as Anne-Marie
 François Patrice as Petit Gars
 Sinoël as Sylvain, le coiffeur
 Paul Amiot as Le chef 
 André Nicard 
 Jean Aymé as Un invité
 Charlotte Ecard as Céline
 Gustave Gallet as Le notaire
 Jacqueline Marbaux as Catherine
 Reggie Nalder as Bébé
 Lucas Gridoux as L'impresario de Marianne
 Jacques Baumer as Jérôme, le maître d'hôtel 
 Arlette Accart 
 Fernand Blot as Le garçon
 Maurice Cartier
 Jacqueline Fontaine as Petit rôle 
 René Hell as Le badaud à la bicyclette
 Julien Lacroix 
 Yolande Laffon as Sophie 
 Simone Max as Petit rôle
 Moriss 
 Henri Niel as Le chanoine
 Roger Vincent as Petit rôle
 Charles Vissières as Le vieux cabot

References

Bibliography 
 Waldman, Harry. Maurice Tourneur: The Life and Films. McFarland, 2001.

External links 
 

1948 films
French crime films
1940s crime films
1940s French-language films
Films directed by Maurice Tourneur
French black-and-white films
1940s French films